Bunyip North is a bounded rural locality in Victoria, Australia,  south-east of Melbourne's central business district, located within the Shire of Cardinia local government area. Bunyip North recorded a population of 95 at the 2021 census.

See also
 Shire of Pakenham – Bunyip North was previously within this former local government area.

References

Shire of Cardinia